The 2017 season was the 15th season of competitive kickboxing in Romania.

List of events

SUPERKOMBAT New Heroes 10 

SUPERKOMBAT New Heroes 10 was a kickboxing event produced by the Superkombat Fighting Championship that took place on March 12, 2017, at the Berăria H in Bucharest, Romania.

Results

SUPERKOMBAT World Grand Prix I 2017

SUPERKOMBAT World Grand Prix I 2017 was a kickboxing event produced by the Superkombat Fighting Championship that took place on April 7, 2017, at the Romexpo Dome in Bucharest, Romania.

Results

SUPERKOMBAT World Grand Prix II 2017
 

SUPERKOMBAT World Grand Prix II 2017 was a kickboxing event produced by the Superkombat Fighting Championship that took place on May 6, 2017, at the Palacio Vistalegre in Madrid, Spain.

Results

Colosseum Tournament 2

Colosseum Tournament 2 was a kickboxing event produced by the Colosseum Tournament that took place on June 17, 2017 at the Stadionul Ilie Oană in Ploieşti, Romania.

Results

Colosseum Tournament 3

Colosseum Tournament 3 (also known as  Romania vs. Germany) was a kickboxing event produced by the Colosseum Tournament that took place on July 14, 2017 at the Arena IDU in Mamaia, Romania.

Results

SUPERKOMBAT World Grand Prix III 2017
 

SUPERKOMBAT World Grand Prix III 2017 was a kickboxing event produced by the Superkombat Fighting Championship that took place on August 26, 2017, at the Shenzhen Arena in Shenzhen, China.

Results

SUPERKOMBAT Expo
 

SUPERKOMBAT Expo was a kickboxing event produced by the Superkombat Fighting Championship that took place on September 17, 2017, at the Romexpo in Bucharest, Romania.

Results

Colosseum Tournament 4

Colosseum Tournament 4 was a kickboxing event produced by the Colosseum Tournament that took place on October 16, 2017 at the Sala Polivalentă in Bucharest, Romania.

Results

See also
2017 in Glory
2017 in K-1
2017 in Kunlun Fight
2017 in Glory of Heroes
2017 in Wu Lin Feng

References

External links 
 Colosseumkickboxing.com
 SUPERKOMBAT.com
 Superkombat Fighting Championship on Facebook 

Kickboxing
2017 in kickboxing
2017 in mixed martial arts
Kickboxing in Romania